Stegron the Dinosaur Man is a fictional supervillain appearing in American comic books published by Marvel Comics. Created by writer Len Wein and artist Gil Kane, the character first appeared in Marvel Team-Up #19 (March 1974).

Fictional character biography
Vincent Stegron was hired by S.H.I.E.L.D. to work with Dr. Curt Connors to study DNA of dinosaurs from the Savage Land. Inspired by the experiment that turned Connors into the Lizard, Stegron stole some dinosaur DNA and injected himself with it. In moments, Stegron transformed into an orange semi-humanoid Stegosaurus-like creature. Stegron gained the ability to command real dinosaurs, and he planned to use them in his plans for conquest of the world and converting all of humanity into creatures like himself. Taking several dinosaurs with him from the Savage Land to New York City, he encountered Spider-Man, Black Panther, and Ka-Zar. During the battle that followed, Stegron was beaten by being knocked into a nearby river and seemingly drowning.

Months later, Stegron returned and blackmailed Connors into helping him restore several dinosaur remains from a museum. Connors did what Stegron asked and accidentally turned into the Lizard. The two reptile-men clashed as Spider-Man arrived and later Stegron was sent into hibernation by the extremely cold temperatures the weather was producing.

Months later Stegron, now back in his human form, woke from hibernation and wandered New York. During a battle between the Vulture and Spider-Man, Stegron regained his dinosaur form and powers and joined many of Spider-Man's enemies (including Doctor Octopus, Vulture, Rhino, Beetle, Boomerang, Answer, Swarm, Strikeback, and Hardshell) in an all-out battle to defeat him. Stegron was knocked unconscious and was taken in by the authorities.

Stegron eventually returned to the Savage Land, where he took over a S.H.I.E.L.D. installation which drew the attention of Thunderstrike, Black Widow, and Black Panther. During the battle over the installation, Stegron was forced into an extremely cold environment and again went into hibernation.

Sometime later, Stegron managed to awaken from his slumber and terrorized Roxxon Oil (who was illegally drilling in the Savage Land). Soon, Stegron was opposed by Ka-Zar, Shanna the She-Devil, and Spider-Man. During the battle, the Hulk and a gigantic chicken/ox-like creature known as Chtylok arrived and helped Stegron fight Roxxon Oil. The heroes joined forces with Stegron when they realized he was trying to protect the Savage Land. Eventually, Stegron managed to scare the Roxxon agents and was left in peace in the Savage Land.

Sometime later, Stegron (reverted to his human form) exiled himself to wander the Arctic Circle when he stumbled upon the Rock of Life. Inspired by its de-evolving abilities, he took it with him back to New York where he slowly began to transform back into his dinosaur form. He then sent the Rock to a friend of his, who then put it on display at the Museum of Natural History in hopes that it would devolve the inhabitants of New York City into prehistoric creatures like himself with him as their leader. As a result, various heroes and villains with connections to the animal kingdom such as Spider-Man, Puma, Black Cat, Vulture, Lizard, Man-Wolf, and Vermin were affected by its power, causing an increase in their savagery. Spider-Man maintained control, and he discovered Stegron's plans at the museum where the two battled. With the help of Mister Fantastic and the Invisible Woman, Spider-Man managed to stop the Rock's powers from reaching others in New York using a piece of his armor. He then beat Stegron into submission. Stegron was then taken into custody by the authorities as the Fantastic Four placed the Rock in a secure vault in the Baxter Building.

Stegron again returned to the Savage Land, but shortly after his return, Roxxon Oil attacked again, intent on obtaining vibranium. Stegron was recruited by Ka-Zar and Brainchild of the Savage Land Mutates to help fight the attackers.

Stegron was later seen in the Negative Zone's Prison during the 2008 "Secret Invasion" storyline.

Somehow, he escaped and returned to the Savage Land. While there he happened upon the starving Devil Dinosaur, who had slumped into a depression after his companion Moon-Boy was kidnapped by S.H.I.E.L.D. agents. Fearing for the survival of the beast (as it was the last of its species), Stegron left the Savage Land without informing Ka-Zar to wage war on S.H.I.E.L.D. Building an army of reanimated dinosaurs, Stegron marched across the US, attacking military base after base, searching for the missing primate. He met little opposition. His only serious challenge coming from attacks by the Fifty State Initiative. Eventually, due to the help of their new recruit Reptil, Stegron was defeated and taken into custody. Learning the motive behind his attack, they agreed to return Moon Boy to the Savage Land to be reunited with his companion.

Stegron later collaborates with Sauron in a plan to turn humanity into dinosaurs where they fought Spider-Man and the mutant students from the Jean Grey School for Higher Learning. The duo's plans are unraveled by their own infighting, purposely exacerbated by their mutual crush Shark Girl who caused their powers to neutralize each other.

Stegron is later revealed as the mastermind behind a monster attack on a church. After Eddie Brock discovers one of Stegron's dinosaurs and delivers it to Liz Allan, CEO of Alchemax, he heads down the sewers and finds his lair, until he is spotted and captured. Venom then manages to escape with help from Moon Girl and Devil Dinosaur, who were investigating the dinosaur attacks. When Venom and Moon Girl return to the hideout, Stegron takes control of Devil Dinosaur and sends him to attack them. Stegron revealed that he had earlier been hired by Alchemax to find a way to have healing factors placed in humans which led to him doing his dinosaur serum experiments on homeless people and wild animals. Before Stegron can dump the dinosaur serum into the water supply, Venom and Moon Girl worked together to free Devil Dinosaur from Stegron's control and defeat Stegron who was placed in Alchemax's custody. Though his Dinosaur People creations still resided underground.

In a prelude to the "Hunted" storyline, Stegron is among the animal-themed characters captured by Taskmaster and Black Ant on Kraven the Hunter's behalf. He is among those who Arcade publicly reveals as the Savage Six.

During the "Sinister War" storyline, Stegron was with the Savage Six when they attack the sight of where the movie that Mary Jane Watson and a disguised Mysterio made was shown.

Stegron later appears as a member of Octavia Vermis' Anti-Arach9.

Powers and abilities
Stegron has superhuman strength, speed, stamina, and durability. Stegron possesses a prehensile tail, which he can use as a weapon or to grasp items, as well as sharp claws and teeth. His skin is very durable and is virtually bulletproof. Stegron also has the mental ability to control or manipulate any dinosaur in an unknown area around him. He has exhibited the power to control or manipulate the reptilian part of the brain in any life form.

During their ill-fated alliance, Sauron granted Stegron the ability to drain life force from others through physical contact.

Like other reptiles, Stegron is vulnerable to cold temperatures.

Reception
 In 2014, WhatCulture ranked Stegron 6th in their "7 Unused Spider-Man Villains Who'd Be Great In The Marvel Cinematic Universe" list.
 In 2020, CBR.com ranked Stegron 5th in their "Spider-Man: 10 Weirdest Animal Villains From The Comics That We'd Like To See In The MCU" list.

Other versions
In the universe in which the series Marvel Adventures is set, the Avengers encounter Stegron in the Savage Land.

During the 2015 "Secret Wars" storyline, a variation of Stegron lives in the Battleworld domain of Spider-Island. When Vincent Stegron is infected by the Spider Queen's Spider Virus, he is inducted into her Brain Trust. This lasts until Agent Venom and his Resistance attacks their base, where Agent Venom gives Vincent Stegron a serum that transforms him into Stegron, as he sides with the Resistance. Stegron later works with Iron Goblin on a retro-generation ray as the Resistance had to relocate to Avengers Mansion. Stegron later breaks into the American Museum of Natural History, where he uses the retro-generation ray on the dinosaur remains, bringing the dinosaurs there back to life. After Agent Venom and his symbiote sacrifice their lives to get the Spider Queen to fall into Columbus Circle, Stegron and his fellow dinosaurs eat her. Some days later, Stegron joins the re-assembled Avengers, whose headquarters he assists in repairing. He is present when Dino-Thor swears Spider-Man in as the new Baron of Spider-Island.

Stegron appears in issue 6 of "Super Hero Squad" (based on The Super Hero Squad Show). He is featured as an archaeologist who is turned into Stegron by an Infinity Fractal.

In other media
Stegron appears in Marvel Avengers Alliance as an associate of the High Evolutionary.

References

External links
 Stegron at Marvel.com
 Stegron at Marvel Wiki
 Stegron at Comic Vine
 Info on spiderfan.org
 

Characters created by Gil Kane
Characters created by Len Wein
Comics characters introduced in 1974
Fictional characters with superhuman durability or invulnerability
Fictional mad scientists
Fictional reptilians
Fictional therianthropes
Marvel Comics characters who are shapeshifters
Marvel Comics characters who can move at superhuman speeds
Marvel Comics characters with superhuman strength
Marvel Comics hybrids
Marvel Comics male supervillains
Marvel Comics mutates
Marvel Comics scientists
S.H.I.E.L.D. agents
Spider-Man characters